Plamen Penev can refer to:

 Plamen Penev (footballer) (born 1994), Bulgarian footballer
 Plamen Penev (wrestler) (born 1975), Bulgarian Olympic wrestler